Cernica is a commune in the southeast part of Ilfov County, Muntenia, Romania, with a population of 9,425 as of 2002. It is composed of five villages: Bălăceanca, Căldăraru, Cernica, Poșta and Tânganu. 

The commune lent its name to the Cernica Monastery, an early 17th-century Orthodox monastery in the nearby town of Pantelimon. The name is also given to the Cernica Forest, the largest wooded area around Bucharest.

The name of the commune is derived from the name of the vornic Cernica Știrbei and is of Slavic origin, meaning "black".

References

Communes in Ilfov County
Localities in Muntenia